This is a list of notable individuals born in Sweden of Lebanese ancestry or people of Lebanese and Swedish dual nationality who live or lived in Sweden.

Business
 Samir Brikho - businessman; former Chief Executive of Amec Foster Wheeler

Films
 Fares Fares - actor
 Josef Fares - film director
 Nour El-Refai - film actress and comedian

Militants
 Oussama Kassir - Islamic militant

Music
 Emilè Azar - singer who took part in Melodifestivalen in 2007 
 Rabih Jaber - singer; member of band Rebound!
 Ralana - musician of Palestinian origin
 Maher Zain - Islamic singer 
 Elias Zazi - musician/composer of Assyrian/Syriac origin

TV and media
 Rebecca Stella Simonsson - blogger, TV host, designer and artist

Sports
 Mouhammed-Ali Dhaini - footballer
 Alexander Michel Melki - footballer
 Felix Michel Melki - footballer
 Mohamed Ramadan - footballer

See also
Lebanese in Sweden
List of Lebanese people
List of Lebanese people (Diaspora)

References

Sweden
 
Lebanese
Lebanese